Compromised  (1931) is an all-talking pre-code drama film produced and released by First National Pictures, a subsidiary of Warner Bros., and directed by John G. Adolfi. The film stars Rose Hobart, Ben Lyon, Claude Gillingwater and Florence Britton. It was based on a play by Edith Fitzgerald. this film is presumed lost

Preservation
No film elements are known to survive. The soundtrack, which was recorded on Vitaphone disks, may survive in private hands.

Cast

Rose Hobart as Ann Brock 
Ben Lyon as Sidney Brock
Claude Gillingwater as John Brock  
Florence Britton as Louise Brock 
Emma Dunn as Mrs. Squires 
Bert Roach as Tony
Delmar Watson as Sandy
Louise Mackintosh as Mrs. Munsey 
Juliette Compton as Connie Holt 
Edgar Norton as Tipton
Adele Watson as Mrs. Bird 
Virginia Sale as Maggie

References

External links

1931 films
1931 drama films
1931 lost films
First National Pictures films
Lost American films
Warner Bros. films
American drama films
American black-and-white films
Films directed by John G. Adolfi
Lost drama films
Films with screenplays by Florence Ryerson
1930s English-language films
1930s American films